Bukong is a Southern Loloish language of Yunnan, China. Bukong is spoken in Jiangcheng Hani and Yi Autonomous County, Mojiang Hani Autonomous County, and Zhenyuan Yi, Hani and Lahu Autonomous County.

References

You Weiqiong [尤伟琼]. 2013. Classifying ethnic groups of Yunnan [云南民族识别研究]. Beijing: Nationalities Press [民族出版社].

Southern Loloish languages
Languages of Yunnan